{{DISPLAYTITLE:2-Carboxy-D-arabitinol 1-phosphate}}

2-Carboxy-D-arabitinol 1-phosphate (or CA1P) is a molecule produced in plants that inhibits RuBisCO, a key enzyme in the Calvin cycle and carbon fixation. In dark conditions, this molecule binds to RuBisCO, preventing it from participating in chemical reactions. As the amount of light present increases, CA1P levels decrease, freeing RuBisCO's reactive ends, allowing more of the molecules to participate in chemical reactions. It can be broken down by the enzyme 2-carboxy-D-arabinitol-1-phosphatase into 2-carboxy-D-arabinitol.

References

Organophosphates
Enzyme inhibitors